Panaqolus purusiensis is a species of catfish in the family Loricariidae. It is native to South America, where it occurs in the Macauã River basin in the Purus River drainage in Brazil for which it is named, although it has also been recorded from the Curanja River, which is also part of the Purus drainage in Peru. The species reaches 13 cm (5.1 inches) SL. It was redescribed in 2014 by Christian A. Cramer due to a lack of information on the species from the original description, which was based on a single specimen.

References 

Ancistrini
Catfish of South America
Fish of Brazil
Fish described in 2014